"Manifest Destiny" is an American comic book storyline published by Marvel Comics through the X-Men related titles and a number of limited series, including a self-titled one. The arc was a follow-up to the storyline entitled "Divided We Stand" which started in the issues cover dated September 2008.

Storyline overview
"Manifest Destiny" deals with the change in the X-Men when they shift their headquarters from Westchester to San Francisco. This is the first time the X-Men have changed their headquarters since their brief relocation to Australia during the 1980s. This will be followed by "X-Infernus", the sequel to "Inferno".

Publication history
The X-Men: Manifest Destiny mini-series itself, is an anthology. The lead story is focused on Iceman and his journey to San Francisco. It is written by Mike Carey, with pencils by Michael Ryan. There are two back-up stories in every issue, focusing on different characters (Karma, Boom-Boom, Nuwa, Juggernaut, Colossus, Nightcrawler, Mercury and many others) and their lives in San Francisco.

Plot summary

Uncanny X-Men
The X-Men open their new base in San Francisco and send a telepathic invitation to every remaining mutant on Earth. Their first fights were against Magneto, Sentinels and the newly formed Hellfire Cult. This is also the introduction to the Sisterhood of Evil Mutants and Madelyne Pryor is seen alive.

Astonishing X-Men
The Astonishing X-Men shows up with a new line-up (Cyclops, Emma Frost, Beast, Storm, Armor, Wolverine). Their first mission was to investigate the murder of an undiscovered mutant.

Cable
X-Force captures Bishop and brings him to the X-Men Headquarters in San Francisco, while Cable is seen 
fighting in the future.

X-Men: Legacy
Cyclops secretly meets with Xavier as one last favor to his former teacher and friend. Elsewhere, the Hellfire Club is discussing Sunspot leaving their ranks and the void that leaves. As Sebastian Shaw tries to create some order, Castlemere and his newfound cybernetic "upgrades" lay waste to another member of the Hellfire Club.

Rogue makes her way to the X-Men's former base in Australia and ends up having a heart to heart talk with Mystique, whose persona is still in her head after the events in "Messiah Complex".

Young X-Men
Cyclops takes Sunspot and Danielle as mentors of the Young X-Men. After establishing an abandoned cathedral in San Francisco as their new base, the Young X-Men (along with mentors Danielle Moonstar and Sunspot) form their team which includes Ink, Anole, Rockslide, and Dust, but without Blindfold.

Manifest Destiny
Iceman lands at a hospital after taking a flight with Opal Tanaka, who reveals herself to be Mystique. Disguised as a doctor, Mystique injects Iceman with a neural inhibitor but he manages to escape and flee on a truck. Mystique finds him yet again and destroys the truck, much to the truck driver's dismay. Iceman saves him and asks him to contact the X-Men, while he faces off with Mystique and tells her to shoot him while looking him in the eyes.

Other short stories include:
Boom-Boom being defeated by Nuwa but taking her revenge by using coffee.
Karma failing to possess Emma Frost and realizing she needs to get her focus back.
The Juggernaut hesitating between a life of crime or as a hero.
Emma Frost coming to terms with the fact that the X-Men have accepted her.
Anole and Graymalkin bonding over their sexuality while Beast explores Greymalkin's history.
Wolverine and Nightcrawler failing to cheer up Colossus, whose mood lightens when he helps a girl save her kitty.
X-23 helping Mercury realize she is more than just quicksilver and no one can tell her she is not a person after she defeats some Hellfire Cult members.
Nightcrawler being depressed over his lack of use as an X-Men and confiding it in a Danger Room created Kitty hologram.

Eternals/X-Men Manifest Destiny
The last three issues of the short Eternals (vol. 4) run sees the relocation of the X-Men to San Francisco collide with Ikaris, his war with Druig, and the sentinel in Golden Gate Park. The final issue sees the X-Men assist with repelling the Horde which has been foreshadowed as coming since the last issue of Eternals (vol. 3) by Neil Gaiman.

Wolverine: Manifest Destiny

Issues
The following issues are related to the storyline:
 Astonishing X-Men #25-30
 Cable #6
 Eternals (vol. 4) #7-9
 Manifest Destiny: Nightcrawler (previously announced as X-Men: Quitting Time)
 Secret Invasion: X-Men #1-4
 Uncanny X-Men #500-507
 Wolverine: Manifest Destiny #1-4
 X-Men: Legacy #215-216
 X-Men: Manifest Destiny #1-5
 Young X-Men #6-9
 Runaways (Vol. 3) # 10

Reading Order
This is the reading order based on the release date of the issues:

July 2008
 Astonishing X-Men #25
 Uncanny X-Men #500

August 2008
 Cable #6
 Secret Invasion: X-Men #1
 Astonishing X-Men #26
 Uncanny X-Men #501
 X-Men: Legacy #215

September 2008
 X-Men: Manifest Destiny #1
 Secret Invasion: X-Men #2
 Uncanny X-Men #502
 Young X-Men #6
 X-Men: Legacy #216

October 2008
 X-Men: Manifest Destiny #2
 Astonishing X-Men #27
 Uncanny X-Men #503
 Young X-Men #7
 Wolverine: Manifest Destiny #1
 Secret Invasion: X-Men #3

November 2008
 X-Men: Manifest Destiny #3
 Uncanny X-Men #504
 Young X-Men #8
 Secret Invasion: X-Men #4

December 2008
 Wolverine: Manifest Destiny #2
 X-Men: Manifest Destiny #4
 Uncanny X-Men #505
 Young X-Men #9
 Wolverine: Manifest Destiny #3

January 2009
 X-Men: Manifest Destiny #5
 Eternals #7
 Astonishing X-Men #28

February 2009
 Wolverine: Manifest Destiny #4
 Eternals #8
 Uncanny X-Men #506

March 2009
 Manifest Destiny: Nightcrawler #1
 Eternals #9
 Uncanny X-Men #507
 Astonishing X-Men #29

May 2009
 Runaways (Vol. 3) #10

June 2009
 Astonishing X-Men #30

Collected editions
The storyline will be collected into a number of volumes:

Uncanny X-Men: Manifest Destiny (collects Uncanny X-Men #500-503, "X-Men Free Comic Book Day", and Manifest Destiny #1-5, 208 pages, April 2009, softcover, November 2009)
X-Men: Manifest Destiny (collects Wolverine: Manifest Destiny #1-4, "X-Men Manifest Destiny: Nightcrawler" and X-Men: Manifest Destiny #1-5, 200 pages, hardcover, June 2009, softcover, September 2009)
Eternals Volume 2 (includes Eternals (vol. 4) #7-9, softcover, 104 pages, September 2009)
Astonishing X-Men Vol. 5: Ghost Box (includes Astonishing X-Men (Vol. 3) #25–30 & Astonishing X-Men: Ghost Boxes #1–2, softcover, December 2009)
Secret Invasion: X-Men (includes Secret Invasion: X-Men #1-4, March 2009)

References

External links

WW Philly: The X-Men's "Manifest Destiny", Comic Book Resources, May 31, 2008
WW Philly: X-Men: Manifest Destiny, Newsarama, May 31, 2008
HeroesCon 2008: X-Men: Manifest Destiny, Comic Book Resources, June 23, 2008
Review of X-Men: Manifest Destiny #1, Comic Book Resources

Comics by Matt Fraction